is a train station located in Uji, Kyoto Prefecture, Japan, on the Keihan Electric Railway Uji Line.

Layout
The station has two side platforms.

Surroundings
 Panasonic Electronic Devices Co., Ltd. (Capacitor Business Unit)
 Kohata Shrine
 Kyoto Animation Studio 2
 Kohata Station on the JR West Nara Line

Adjacent stations

Railway stations in Kyoto Prefecture